Nicholas Gilbert Erskine Hudson (born 14 February 1959,Wimbledon, London) is the Roman Catholic titular Bishop of St Germans in Cornwall. He has responsibility for the pastoral care of Central and East London, consisting of the Deaneries of Camden, Hackney, Islington, Marylebone, Tower Hamlets and Westminster. He has oversight of the Agency for Evangelisation, Youth, and Justice and Peace.

Bishop Nicholas studied at Jesus College, Cambridge before undertaking priestly formation at the Venerable English College, Rome.

References

External links

1959 births
Living people
21st-century Roman Catholic bishops in England
People from Wimbledon, London